John Richard Palamountain (19 April 1866 – 30 August 1942) was an Australian politician. He was born in Ballarat, Victoria, Australia. In 1926 he was elected to the Tasmanian House of Assembly as a Labor member for Wilmot. He held the seat until his defeat in 1928. Palamountain died at Hobart in 1942.

References

1866 births
1942 deaths
Members of the Tasmanian House of Assembly
People from Ballarat
Australian Labor Party members of the Parliament of Tasmania